Nicolai Bryhnisveen (born 31 October 1991) is a Norwegian ice hockey defenceman. He is currently playing for Stavanger Oilers of the Norwegian GET-ligaen.

International
Bryhnisveen was named to the Norway men's national ice hockey team for competition at the 2014 IIHF World Championship.

References

External links
 

1991 births
Living people
Asplöven HC players
Coventry Blaze players
HC Dukla Jihlava players
Lillehammer IK players
Lørenskog IK players
Norwegian ice hockey defencemen
Oulun Kärpät players
Ice hockey people from Oslo
Stavanger Oilers players
Timrå IK players
Tingsryds AIF players
Vålerenga Ishockey players
SønderjyskE Ishockey players
Norwegian expatriate ice hockey people
Norwegian expatriate sportspeople in the Czech Republic
Norwegian expatriate sportspeople in Denmark
Norwegian expatriate sportspeople in England
Norwegian expatriate sportspeople in Sweden
Norwegian expatriate sportspeople in Finland
Expatriate ice hockey players in the Czech Republic
Expatriate ice hockey players in Denmark
Expatriate ice hockey players in England
Expatriate ice hockey players in Sweden
Expatriate ice hockey players in Finland